Ingham Township is one of sixteen townships in Franklin County, Iowa, United States.  As of the 2010 census, its population was 311 and it contained 145 housing units.

History
Ingham Township was organized in 1858. It was named for George H. Ingham, a pioneer settler and native of Ohio.

Geography

Cities, towns, villages
 Hansell

Cemeteries
The township contains Hansell Cemetery.

Transportation
 Iowa Highway 3

School districts
 Hampton-Dumont Community School District

Political districts
 Iowa's 4th congressional district
 State House District 54
 State Senate District 27

References

External links
 City-Data.com

Townships in Iowa
Townships in Franklin County, Iowa
Populated places established in 1858
1858 establishments in Iowa